Todd Marshall McShay (born March 22, 1977) is an American football television analyst and commentator.

Early life
McShay attended North Shore Christian School in Lynn, Massachusetts and then Swampscott High School in Swampscott, Massachusetts, where he played quarterback for the Big Blue, and graduated in 1995.

He then attended the University of Richmond, where he was a walk-on for the Spiders in 1995 and served as a scout-team quarterback before sustaining a back injury that ended his college career.

He graduated from Richmond in 1999 with a B.A. from the Jepson School of Leadership Studies.

Professional career
McShay had worked as an undergraduate  team equipment manager at the University of Richmond before landing an internship with former NFL scout Gary Horton in 1998. Following graduation, McShay worked full-time for "The War Room", (1999–2006) a start-up publication created by Horton eventually bought by ESPN and renamed "Scouts Inc."

He joined ESPN in 2006 as a football analyst, providing in-depth scouting information on college football players across the country. He makes regular appearances on a number of ESPN programs, including ESPNU Coaches Spotlight, SportsCenter, and ESPN Radio focusing on the NFL Draft. He is often featured alongside ESPN college football analyst Mel Kiper, Jr.

On September 7, 2021, McShay announced he was taking a break from ESPN "to focus on my health and my family". This came three days after working as a sideline reporter on an ESPN college football broadcast, during which viewers expressed concern on social media about his well being during an on-air segment.

Personal life
McShay is married to Lauren "Lo" (Sullivan) McShay, a Boston University graduate and current owner of LoLo Event Design in Boston.
 McShay grew up with, was a roommate of, and maintains a friendship with Barstool Sports founder Dave Portnoy.

References

Sources
Todd McShay ESPN MediaZone (March 10, 2010)
ESPN MediaZone (June 2, 2011)

1977 births
Living people
People from Swampscott, Massachusetts
Sportspeople from Essex County, Massachusetts
Players of American football from Massachusetts
American football quarterbacks
Richmond Spiders football players
College football announcers
National Football League announcers
Kansas City Chiefs announcers